The Zink Block is a historic commercial building located at Buffalo in Erie County, New York. It was built in 1896 for William T. Zink for his furniture sales and repair store. It is a five-story, brick building with a flat roof and Italian Renaissance Revival detailing. It sits on a stone foundation. The seven bay front facade features two stacked tripartite bay window units on the second through fourth floors.

It was listed on the National Register of Historic Places in 2010.

Gallery

References

External links

 Buffalo Rising blog:Former Horsefeathers Site Joins National Register

Commercial buildings on the National Register of Historic Places in New York (state)
Commercial buildings completed in 1896
Buildings and structures in Buffalo, New York
National Register of Historic Places in Buffalo, New York